Lemazy (Lämäź) is a rural locality (a selo) and the administrative centre of Lemazinsky Selsoviet, Duvansky District, Bashkortostan, Russia. The population was 531 as of 2010. There are 3 streets.

Geography 
Lemazy is located 40 km northwest of Mesyagutovo (the district's administrative centre) by road. Kutrasovka is the nearest rural locality.

References 

Rural localities in Duvansky District